John Meyer may refer to:

Politics
 John Meyer (Illinois politician) (1852–1895), American politician and lawyer
 John Ambrose Meyer (1899–1969), Maryland congressman
 John P. Meyer (1920–2013), American politician and judge
 John R. Meyer (legislator) (1930–2010), American physicist and politician in Wisconsin

Sports
 John Meyer (American football) (1942–2020)
 John-Hubert Meyer (born 1993), South African rugby union player
 Jack Meyer (educator and cricketer) (1905–1991), English educationalist
 Jack Meyer (1932–1967), American baseball player
 John Meyer (born 1983), Canadian soccer player for Danbury United

Other
 John Meyer (artist) (born 1942), South African painter
 John Meyer (audio engineer) (born before 1949), loudspeaker designer
 John Austin Meyer (1919–1997), American aerial photographer and chemist
 John C. Meyer (1919–1975), U.S. Air Force general
 John Charles Meyer (born before 2000), American actor and film producer
 John R. Meyer (1927–2009), American economist
 John S. Meyer (1924–2011), American doctor
 John Stryker Meyer (born 1946), author of Across the Fence: The Secret War in Vietnam
 John W. Meyer (born 1935/1936), American sociologist
 John Meyer (settler), 19th-century Canadian settler of what is now Wilmot, Ontario

See also 
John Meyers (disambiguation)
John Meier (disambiguation)
John Mayer (disambiguation)